Sarab-e Suri (also Romanized as Sarāb-e Sūrī and Sarāb Sīrī; also known as Sarāb-e Mīrī) is a village in Azna Rural District, in the Central District of Khorramabad County, Lorestan Province, Iran. At the 2006 census, its population was 336, in 89 families.

References 

Towns and villages in Khorramabad County